Aleksandar Nikačević (born 26 January 1978 in Kraljevo) is a Serbian former road cyclist. After retiring from racing, he worked as a directeur sportif for the Aerospace Engineering Pro Equipe and Team Endeka.

Major results
1999
 1st Overall Giro del Friuli Venezia Giulia
1st Stage 3
 7th Time trial, UCI Road World Under-23 Championships
2000
 Yugoslav National Road Championships
1st  Time trial
2nd Road race
 1st Overall Tour de Serbie
 1st Trofeo Città di San Vendemiano
 6th GP Palio del Recioto
2002
 1st  Road race, Yugoslav National Road Championships
 1st Overall Tour de Serbie
 1st Stage 3 Tour of Qinghai Lake
 5th Overall Bayern Rundfahrt

References

External links

1978 births
Living people
Serbian male cyclists
Yugoslav male cyclists
Sportspeople from Kraljevo